is a 2016 Japanese television drama series starring Sakura Miyawaki and Jurina Matsui. It is the sequel to Majisuka Gakuen 5, set in an alternate timeline where the events of that season never happened but the Majisuka All-Girls High School goes bankrupt. In order to save their school from shutting down, the girls decide to open and work at a hostess bar called . It started airing on October 29, 2016 on Nippon Television and concluded on January 14, 2017.

Cast
Sakura Miyawaki as Sakura (Same)
Yui Yokoyama as Otabe (Maguro)
Haruka Kodama as Katsuzetsu (Tai)
Yuria Kizaki as Magic (Gari)
Jurina Matsui as Center (Kurage)
Nana Okada as Katabutsu (Karei)
Juri Takahashi as Uonome (Iwashi)
Ryoka Oshima as Kusogaki (Ankō)
Mion Mukaichi as Jisedai (Fugu)
Mako Kojima as Kamisori (Ika)
Haruka Komiyama as Ikizama (Isoginchaku)
Rika Nakai as Shūkai (Nodoguro)
Mio Tomonaga as Bōyomi (Tatsuno-otoshigo)
Yui Kojina as Mirror (Kiss)
Sayaka Yamamoto as Antonio
Miru Shiroma as Shirogiku
Fuuko Yagura as Kurobara
Ririka Suto as Tetsugaku
Nagisa Shibuya as Hachikō
Tomu Mutō as Tsun
Saya Kawamoto as Rookie
Akari Yoshida as Red
Toshio Kakei as Saionji, Cabaret Club Producer
Suekichi-kun as Satoshi
Kyosuke Yabe
Koki Okada
Akimasa Haraguchi
Kazumasa Koura
Ryohei Abe
Toshiya Sakai
Zen Kajiwara

Guest appearance
Nanase Nishino as Nogi Female Student (ep.1)
Mayu Watanabe as Nezumi (Utsubo) (ep.3)
Yu Inaba as Tsuyoshi Tsujimoto, System Engineer (ep.3 - 6, 10)
Haruna Kojima as Kojiharu (Konbu) (ep.4)
Yuki Kashiwagi as Yuki Kashiwagi (Anago) (ep.4 - 5)
Maria Abe as Maria (ep.5)
Rena Kato as Dodobusu (Namazu), Fortune Teller (ep.5 - 10)
Hana Matsuoka as Hana Matsuoka (Wakasagi) (ep.7)
Rino Sashihara as Scandal (ep.8)
Anna Iriyama as Yoga (Iruka) (ep.8 - 10)
Kaori Matsumura as Kaori Matsumura, Hostess (ep.8, mentioned only)
Nao Furuhata as Nao Furuhata, Hostess (ep. 10)
Akane Takayanagi as Akane Takayanagi, Hostess (ep.8, mentioned only)
Akari Suda as Akari Suda, Hostess (ep.8, mentioned only)
Sarina Sōda as Sarina Sōda, Hostess (ep.8, mentioned only)
Haruka Futamura as Haruka Futamura, Hostess (ep.8, mentioned only)
Haruka Shimazaki as Salt (Plankton) (ep.8 - 9)
Mai Shiraishi as Nogi Female Student (ep.10)

References

External links
 

2016 Japanese television series debuts
2017 Japanese television series endings
Nippon TV dramas
AKB48